Kolomna class (Russian: Коломна класс) is a class of sea-going dry cargo steamers, tweendeckers, that were built in VEB Schiffswerft Neptun, Rostock, GDR, between 1952 and 1958, as per Projects 233. In total 17 Kolomna-class ships were built as per program for modernization of the Soviet Union merchant fleet.

The ships was delivered to the various shipping companies of the Soviet Union.

Ship's data
Ship's type:
 steamer;
 dry cargo ship.

Constructive type:
 tweendecker;
 three-islands (3 structures): accommodation superstructure, forecastle and aftcastle);
 with a middle location of MO and accommodation superstructure;
 with a sloping nose and a cruiser stern.

Purpose: transportation of general cargo.

Length overall 102.33 m; length between perpendiculars 96.8 m; breadth 14.44 m
Moulded depth 7.93 m; draught 6.65 m.

GT = 3245-3862 mt, DWT = 4355-4410 mt, speed 12,6 / 13,6 knots.

One main steam boiler «DMT 24 50/90" (GDR) with capacity 2450 hp (1800 kW).

All ships were steamers before 1961 and engines of all ships were modernized to liquid oil from 1961.

Cargo corpartments: total 4.

Cargo gear: 8 cargo derricks (2 for each cargo corpartment) and 2 heavy lift cargo derricks.

All ships had high ventilation heads (ganders or mushrooms) and was possible to divide all Kolomna-class ships to some subclasses as per ventilation heads type.

Crew: 36 persons.
Passengers or cadets: 18 persons.

Ships in class

References

Ships of Black Sea Shipping Company
Ships of Azov Shipping Company
Ships of the Soviet Union
Non-combat military operations involving the Soviet Union
Ships built in Rostock
Merchant ships of the Soviet Union